"Dancing's Done" is a song by American singer Ava Max. It was released on December 20, 2022 by Atlantic Records as the fourth single from her second studio album Diamonds & Dancefloors (2023). A visualizer for the song was released on December 21, 2022.

Background
The song is the fourth single off of Max's second album Diamonds & Dancefloors, following the release of the singles "Maybe You're the Problem", "Million Dollar Baby" and the first promotional single "Weapons". The album was due to be released on October 14, 2022, but the release was postponed to January 27, 2023.

"Dancing's Done" was released on December 20, 2022, alongside a new cover photo for the album, featuring a full body shot of Max, now laid on a bed of diamonds, wearing diamante negligee. The song is the closing track to the album.

In "Dancing's Done", Max sings about pursuing the object of her affection. Lyrically it creates a picture of the end of a night out, where the music has stopped and the couple dancing have to decide what is next in their adventure together.

Credits and personnel

Credits adapted from Tidal.

 Amanda Ava Koci – vocals, composition, songwriting 
 Mathew James Burns – production, songwriting 
 Peter Rycroft – composition, production, songwriting 
 Henry Walter – composition, songwriting, background vocals
 Pablo Bowman – composition, songwriting 
 Sean Douglas – composition, songwriting 
 Bryce Bordone – mixer engineering assistance
 Chris Gehringer – mastering
 John Hanes – engineering
 Serban Ghenea – mixer

Charts

Release history

References

2022 songs
2022 singles
Atlantic Records singles